James Knight (4 May 1891 - 1948) was a British actor. Born in Canterbury, Kent and starting as a wrestler, he became a leading man in British silent films, and later a character actor in smaller film roles.

Selected filmography

 The Happy Warrior (1917) - The Happy Warrior
 The Splendid Coward (1918) - Dick Swinton
 Big Money (1918) - Tom Carlyn
 A Romany Lass (1918) - Donald MacLean
 Deception (1918) - Jeffrey North
 Nature's Gentleman (1918) - James Davis
 The Silver Greyhound (1919) - John Vane
 The Power of Right (1919) - Gerald Stafford
 Tower of Strength (1919) - Jack Farrars
 The Knave of Hearts (1919) - Lord Hillsdown
 The Man Who Forgot (1919) - Seth Nalden
 Brenda of the Barge (1920) - Jim Walden
 The Education of Nicky (1921) - Nicky Malvesty
 Love in the Welsh Hills (1921)
 No. 7 Brick Row (1922) - Dr. James Peacock
 Hornet's Nest (1923) - Tony Cobb
 The Lady Owner (1923) - Dick Tressider
 Beautiful Kitty (1923) - Jim Bennett
 What Price Loving Cup? (1923) - Philip Denham
 Men Who Forget (1923)
 The Great Turf Mystery (1924) - Luke Pomeroy
 Claude Duval (1924) - Captain Craddock
 Trainer and Temptress (1925) - Peter Todd
 Woodcroft Castle (1926)
 The Ball of Fortune (1926) - Dick Huish
 When Giants Fought (1926, Short) - Grenadier
 Motherland (1927) - Private Tom Edwards
 Mr. Nobody (1927)
 Maria Marten (1928) - Carlos
 Houp La! (1928) - Daniel
 Spangles (1928) - Haggerston
 Cupid in Clover (1929)
 Power Over Men (1929) - Cesa
 The Adventures of Dick Turpin (1929) - Tom King
 Kissing Cup's Race (1930) - Detective
 A Safe Affair (1931) - Tom
 The Third String (1932) - Webson
 When London Sleeps (1932) - Garnett
 That Night in London (1932) - Inspector Brody
 Crime on the Hill (1933) - Newspaper Editor (uncredited)
 Lost in the Legion (1934) - Ryan
 The Man Who Knew Too Much (1934) - Police Inspector (uncredited)
 The 39 Steps (1935) - Detective at London Palladium (uncredited)
 The Passing of the Third Floor Back (1935) -  Police Inspector (uncredited)
 Sexton Blake and the Bearded Doctor (1935) - Red
 Cotton Queen (1937) - Shooting Gallery Attendant (uncredited)
 Strange Boarders (1938) - Fire Chief (uncredited)
 Trouble Brewing (1939) - Brewery Foreman (uncredited)
 The Four Just Men (1939) - Policeman Outside Parliament (uncredited)
 There Ain't No Justice (1939) - Police Constable (uncredited)
 Cheer Boys Cheer (1939) - Chauffeur (uncredited)
 Convoy (1940) - Admiral (uncredited)
 Let George Do It! (1940) - Passenger on SS Macaulay (uncredited)
 Girl in the News (1940) - Traffic Policeman (uncredited)
 Gasbags (1941) - German Major (uncredited)
 Inspector Hornleigh Goes To It (1941) - Cinema Manager (uncredited)
 Jeannie (1941) - (uncredited)
 The Next of Kin (1942) - Sailor on Train (uncredited)
 The Day Will Dawn (1942) - Fossen the Village Postmaster (uncredited)
 Let the People Sing (1942) - Minor Role (uncredited)
 Much Too Shy (1942) - Mr. Pepper - Cinema Manager
 The Life and Death of Colonel Blimp (1943) - Club Porter (1902)
 San Demetrio London (1943) - Capt. Smith - S.S. Gloucester City
 Medal for the General (1944) - Sargeant (uncredited)
 Candles at Nine (1944) - Air-Raid Warden (uncredited)
 Johnny Frenchman (1945) - Tom Hocking
 The Agitator (1945) - Business Man (uncredited)
 Loyal Heart (1946) - Police Sergeant
 A Girl in a Million (1946) - Pavilion Manager
 Appointment with Crime (1946) - Smokey
 Code of Scotland Yard (1947) - Publican (uncredited)
 My Sister and I (1948) - Dustman
 Old Mother Riley's New Venture (1949) - Police Superintendent
 Boys in Brown (1949) - Prison Officer (uncredited)
 Seven Days to Noon (1950) - Mr. Cooper (Pawnbroker) (uncredited)
 The Magnet (1950) - Auction Bidder (uncredited) (final film role)

References

External links
 

English male film actors
English male silent film actors
Male actors from Kent
20th-century English male actors